Captain Lord James Nugent Boyle Bernardo Townshend KCH (11 September 1785 – 28 June 1842), was a British naval commander and Tory politician.

Townshend was the younger son of George Townshend, 1st Marquess Townshend, by his second wife Anne, daughter of Sir William Montgomery, 1st Baronet. He was the nephew of Charles Townshend and the half-brother of George Townshend, 2nd Marquess Townshend, Lord John Townshend and Lord Charles Townshend. On 21 September 1822, he was appointed major-commandant of the Norfolk Yeomanry Rangers, in place of his brother Lord Charles.

Townshend was a captain in the Royal Navy. He was also appointed a captain in the Norfolk Rangers of Yeomanry Cavalry on 18 April 1831. In 1818 he was returned to parliament as one of two representative for Helston, a constituency mainly controlled by his brother-in-law, the Duke of Leeds. He lost his seat in 1832 when the representation was reduced to one member, but was once again elected in 1835. This time he held the seat until 1837.

Townshend married Elizabeth, daughter of Provo Featherstone Wallis and sister of Provo Wallis, on 13 June 1813. He died in June 1842, aged 56.

References

External links

1785 births
1842 deaths
Norfolk Yeomanry officers
Members of the Parliament of the United Kingdom for Helston
Royal Navy officers
James Nugent Boyle Bernardo
UK MPs 1818–1820
UK MPs 1820–1826
UK MPs 1826–1830
UK MPs 1830–1831
UK MPs 1831–1832
UK MPs 1835–1837
Younger sons of marquesses
Tory MPs (pre-1834)
Conservative Party (UK) MPs for English constituencies